Guzzoni is a surname of Italian origin. People with that name include:

 Alfredo Guzzoni (1877-1965), Italian military officer who served in both World War I and World War II
 Tommaso Guzzoni (1632-1704), Roman Catholic prelate who served as Bishop of Sora

See also
 Guzoni (disambiguation)
 

Surnames of Italian origin